The Mwalimu Nyerere Foundation (MNF) named after the first President of Tanzania, was established in June 1996. It is an intellectually and politically independent non-governmental organization (NGO) based in Tanzania. The vision is for the Foundation to become a "regional centre of excellence and advocate in the promotion of peace, unity and people-centered development in Africa and the world through justice for all." The mission is to achieve this through research, policy advice, consultative exchanges and partnerships. In all this, the Foundation's work is based on Mwalimu Nyerere's belief in the fundamental principle that all humanity, regardless of their differences, is the purpose and justification for the existence of society and people are fundamental to any process of development. 

Foundations based in Tanzania
F